Michael Gannon may refer to:

Michael Gannon (politician) (1848–1898), Member of the Queensland Legislative Assembly
Michael Gannon (historian) (1928–2017), American historian
Michael Gannon (obstetrician), President of the Australian Medical Association
Mickey Gannon, fictional character in the Australian TV series Neighbours
Mick Gannon (born 1947), Irish footballer
Mick Gannon (English footballer) (born 1943), English footballer